The Catholic Church in Cuba is part of the worldwide Catholic Church, under the spiritual leadership of the Pope in Rome. Catholics make up approximately half of the population of Cuba.

History

Catholicism has historically been the majority religion since Cuba's colonization. However, Communist Cuba is no exception to the ideological clash between Communism and Catholicism that was common in communist countries. After Fidel Castro's ascent to power in 1959, he imposed restrictions on religious activities such as Christmas celebrations, and in 1962 barred personnel of the Church from joining the Communist Party of Cuba - following a communist tradition of Marxist-Leninist atheism. However, Castro's efforts were not as successful as in traditionally communist countries such as the USSR or China.

When the Cold War ended, such restrictions were lifted and the atheist guidelines outlined in the Cuban Constitution were removed. Catholics have been able openly join the Party since 1990. In 1998 Pope John Paul II made an official visit to Cuba and met Fidel Castro in person. Castro honored the Pope publicly. Pope Benedict XVI visited in 2012, meeting both Fidel and Raúl Castro, as did Pope Francis in 2015.

Current status

The Catholic Church body in Cuba is governed by the Cuban Bishops Conference. There are over six million Catholics - around 60.5% of the total population.  The country is divided into eleven dioceses including three archdioceses.

The Catholic Church in Cuba has taken on a more politically active role than in many other countries. It claims to have engaged in discussion with the government on issues such as political prisoners and free market reforms.

Catholics in Cuba have greater religious freedom than those in other Communist countries such as China and Vietnam.

Structure
 Archdiocese of San Cristóbal de la Habana
 Diocese of Pinar del Río
 Diocese of Matanzas
 Archdiocese of Camagüey
 Diocese of Ciego de Avila
 Diocese of Cienfuegos
 Diocese of Santa Clara
 Archdiocese of Santiago de Cuba
 Diocese of Guantánamo-Baracoa
 Diocese of Holguín
 Diocese of Santísimo Salvador de Bayamo y Manzanillo

See also

 Conference of Catholic Bishops of Cuba
 List of Central American and Caribbean Saints
 Religion in Cuba

References

 
Cuba